Richard Neil Thompson (born November 1, 1958) is a former Major League Baseball relief pitcher who played for the Cleveland Indians and the Montreal Expos (–). In his career, he made 77 appearances and went 3-10 with a 5.05 ERA.

External links

1958 births
Living people
American expatriate baseball players in Canada
Amherst Mammoths baseball players
Cleveland Indians players
Lamar High School (Arlington, Texas) alumni
Major League Baseball pitchers
Montreal Expos players
Baseball players from New York City
Winnipeg Goldeyes players
Albany-Colonie Yankees players
American expatriate baseball players in Taiwan
Baseball players from Massachusetts
Batavia Trojans players
Buffalo Bisons (minor league) players
Chattanooga Lookouts players
Columbus Clippers players
Industriales de Monterrey players
Jacksonville Expos players
Knoxville Blue Jays players
Maine Guides players
Memphis Chicks players
Oklahoma City 89ers players
Omaha Royals players
Vancouver Canadians players
Waterloo Indians players
Wei Chuan Dragons players